Aerenea flavolineata is a species of beetle in the family Cerambycidae. It was described by Melzer in 1923. It is found in Argentina, Bolivia, Paraguay and Brazil.

References

Compsosomatini
Beetles described in 1923